Tom and Jerry: The Movie is a 1992 American animated musical comedy film based on the characters Tom and Jerry created by William Hanna and Joseph Barbera. Produced and directed by Phil Roman from a screenplay by Dennis Marks (who also scripted some episodes of Tom & Jerry Kids at the time), the film stars the voices of Richard Kind, Dana Hill (in her final film role), Anndi McAfee, Tony Jay, Rip Taylor, Henry Gibson, Michael Bell, Ed Gilbert, David L. Lander, Howard Morris and Charlotte Rae.

It is the first theatrical feature-length animated film featuring the cat-and-mouse pair as well as their return to the big screen after 25 years. Although largely mute in the original cartoons, the duo are given extensive spoken dialogue for the only time to date. Joseph Barbera, co-founder of Hanna-Barbera and co-creator of Tom and Jerry, served as creative consultant for the film. The film tells the story about an eight-year-old girl named Robyn Starling, who enlists Tom and Jerry's help to escape from her evil abusive aunt and reunite with her lost and presumed-dead father.

After having its world premiere in Germany on October 1, 1992, Tom and Jerry: The Movie was released theatrically in the United States on July 30, 1993, by Miramax Films. As the film only grossed $3.6 million on a $3.5 million budget, it underperformed at the box office, and was panned by critics, audiences, and fans of the franchise, for its screenplay, direction, musical numbers, and Tom and Jerry's dialogue, while the animation style, voice acting, and Mancini's musical score (one of his final works) were mostly praised.

Plot 
Tom's owners move to a new house, but he is distracted by his pursuit of Jerry and is left behind by the moving van. Tom chases the van, but is attacked by a bulldog Spike presumably and forced to hide in the empty house. The next morning, upon waking up to seeing the demolition wreaking ball Spike flees in terror, the house is demolished, leaving Tom and Jerry homeless and wandering the streets until they meet a stray dog named Puggsy and his flea companion, Frankie. Upon introducing themselves, Tom and Jerry, discovering they can both speak, are persuaded to befriend each other to survive. While Tom and Jerry search for food, Puggsy and Frankie are captured by dogcatchers, and Tom is confronted by a hostile group of singing alley cats until Jerry traps them in a sewer. Tom and Jerry soon meet Robyn Starling, a young runaway girl whose mother died when she was a baby. After her father supposedly died in an avalanche during an expedition in Tibet, Robyn and her family's fortune were put in the custody of her father's villainous stepsister Aunt Pristine Figg and her lawyer Lickboot, who see Robyn only as a means to keep their obtained wealth. A local police officer finds and brings Robyn, Tom, and Jerry home.

Figg reluctantly allows Tom and Jerry to stay. However, the pair's food fight with Figg's obese skateboard-riding dachshund Ferdinand and their discovery of a telegram confirming the survival of Robyn's father convinces Figg to send them to her sadistic animal trafficking henchman Dr. Applecheek. His public persona as a kind animal lover allows Figg to falsely assure Robyn as she locks her in the attic. Tom and Jerry reunite with Puggsy and Frankie, who suggest using a nearby control panel to release the cages, freeing numerous captured animals. Tom and Jerry return to Robyn and inform her of her father's survival. The three set out on a raft to find Robyn's father, but the raft is suddenly struck by a ship and they are separated. Meanwhile, in Tibet, Robyn's father is alerted of his daughter's situation and flies back to America to find her.

The next day, Figg and Lickboot place a $1 million bounty on Robyn that they have no intent on paying. Robyn is found and hosted by amusement park manager Captain Kiddie and his puppet Squawk. Kiddie is initially accommodating to Robyn until he sees Figg's bounty on a milk carton, whereupon he detains Robyn on a Ferris wheel and, revealing he is one of Figg's henchmen, contacts her. Applecheek also learns of the bounty and attempts to collect it before Figg's arrival. Tom and Jerry find and rescue Robyn and escape in a paddle steamer with Figg, Lickboot, Kiddie, and Applecheek in hot pursuit. Applecheek falls from a bridge and sinks Kiddie's dinghy, while Figg and Lickboot head to "Robyn's Nest" – a small cabin where Robyn and her father spent their summers – predicting she will hide there.

At the cabin, Tom, Jerry and Robyn are ambushed by Figg and Lickboot. During a brief clash, an oil lamp is knocked over and starts a fire. While Figg and Lickboot attempt to escape, Tom, Jerry and Robyn take refuge on the roof. Figg and Lickboot manage to vacate the cabin, but stumble on Ferdinand's skateboard and crash onto the paddle steamer, which sails out of control down the river. Robyn's father arrives by helicopter and rescues her, while Tom and Jerry barely manage to survive the cabin's collapse. As Figg, Lickboot, Ferdinand, Applecheek, Kiddie, and Squawk are arrested for the bounty for Robyn and trying to kill Tom and Jerry, the pair begin a new life in Robyn's luxurious villa and briefly return to their old habits.

Voice cast 
 Richard Kind as Tom
 Dana Hill as Jerry
 Anndi McAfee as Robyn Starling
 Charlotte Rae as Aunt Pristine Figg
 Tony Jay as Lickboot
 Michael Bell as Ferdinand and Straycatcher 1
 Henry Gibson as Dr. Applecheek
 Ed Gilbert as Puggsy, Mr. Starling
 David Lander as Frankie da Flea
 Rip Taylor as Captain Kiddie
 Howard Morris as Squawk
 Sydney Lassick as Straycatcher 2
 Don Messick as Droopy
 Tino Insana as Police Officer
 B. J. Ward as Tom's Owner
 Greg Burson as Moving Man
 Raymond McLeod as Bulldog
 Raymond McLeod, Mitchell D. Moore, Scott Wojahn as Alleycats

Production

Development 
There were numerous attempts to make a Tom and Jerry feature film, mainly in the 1970s after the successful reruns of the original cartoons and the airings of the new TV animated versions (although there have been debatable possibilities of making attempts in the golden age of cartoons). Chuck Jones, who previously worked on his take on the characters in his studio MGM Animation/Visual Arts, wanted to make a Tom and Jerry film but later pulled the plug on the idea due to not finding a suitable script to work with.

Among of the attempts (with Jones involved) was when MGM wanted to make the feature in live-action with David Newman (one of the writers who wrote Bonnie and Clyde) to write the screenplay and for Dustin Hoffman and Chevy Chase to star as the duo, but sometime later, the idea was shelved.

In the late 1980s, Phil Roman and his company Film Roman managed to revive the attempts of making an animated film featuring the duo after his experience in directing the animated specials featuring another popular cartoon cat Garfield, as well as his love for the original Tom and Jerry cartoons. This gave the opportunity of making it the first theatrical animated film for Film Roman and his second directorial role for a theatrical animated film since Race for Your Life, Charlie Brown, though in this case as an individual director after directing the TV movie Garfield: His 9 Lives, with Joseph Barbera aboard as a consultant. One of the rare options the crew decided to take is going in a different direction and something new on the portrayal of the duo by giving them fluent dialogue, because they considered that most of the audience would feel bored or uninterested in the repetitively mute aspect.

In the early development of the script by Dennis Marks, some of its dialogue and actions in other scenes, including the main characters talking throughout at the beginning before encountering Puggsy and Frankie, had to be taken out. Originally, a comedic sequence before the further events of the duo talking was drafted as a prologue and homage to the original cartoons before the credits, but it was later decided to drop the idea and partially replaced by the animated slapstick scenes during the credits for the sake of moving forward on the situations for the story.

Animation 
Animators on Tom and Jerry: The Movie include Eric Thomas, Art Roman, Doug Frankel, Tony Fucile, Steven E. Gordon, Leslie Gorin, Dan Haskett, Brian Robert Hogan, Gabi Payn, Irven Spence and Arnie Wong. Some animation was outsourced to Wang Film Productions in Taiwan, where James Miko and Aundre Knutson served as supervising directors. Additional animation was provided by The Baer Animation Company and Creative Capers Cartoons. The computer animation for the vehicles was provided by Kroyer Films.

Music 

During production, after witnessing the successful start of Disney's musical Renaissance, the crew decided to make the film a musical and hired Oscar-winning composers Henry Mancini and Leslie Bricusse to write the musical numbers after working in another musical film together titled Victor/Victoria, with a touch of melodic structure reminiscent to the classic golden age of movie musicals, especially the ones from MGM like The Wizard of Oz and Singin' in the Rain, and with help from music students at Roger Williams University. Original songs performed in the film include "Friends to the End", "What Do We Care? (The Alley Cats' Song)", "(Money is Such) A Beautiful Word", "God's Little Creatures", "I Miss You (Robyn's Song)", "I've Done It All", and "All in How Much We Give".

A soundtrack album was released by MCA Records in 1993 and included both the songs and score from the film, composed by Henry Mancini. The end credits has a pop version of "I Miss You" (the song Robyn sings), this time sung by Stephanie Mills (this version of the song is strangely absent from the soundtrack) which is slowly followed by "All in How Much We Give" also sung by Stephanie Mills. "All in How Much We Give" was written by Jody Davidson.

Songs 
Original songs performed in the film include:

Reception

Critical response 
The film received generally negative reviews from critics. Review aggregation website Rotten Tomatoes gives the film a 14% approval rating based on 14 reviews, with an average score of 3.4/10. Audiences polled by CinemaScore gave the film an average grade of "A-" on an A+ to F scale.

Joseph McBride of Variety gave the film a negative review, saying that "Tom and Jerry Talk won't go down in film history as a slogan to rival Garbo Talks." Charles Solomon of the Los Angeles Times panned the film's songs and Phil Roman's direction. Hal Hinson of The Washington Post criticized the dialogue between the cat and mouse and said that the voices "don't fit the characters". Hinson also complained that the musical numbers are "as forgettable as they are intolerably bouncy and upbeat".

Gene Siskel and Roger Ebert awarded the film thumbs down ratings on their show Siskel & Ebert. Although they praised the animation style for its faithfulness to the theatrical shorts, neither thought that it was a good idea to give dialogue to the two characters. Additionally, they felt that the film suffered from a lack of slapstick action compared to the shorts, and criticized the story for giving the character of Robyn Starling more screen time than the titular characters. Vincent Canby of The New York Times was more positive in his review; he praised Mancini's score and the musical numbers, and felt that "[the characters of] Tom and Jerry have charm."

Box office 
Tom and Jerry: The Movie released theatrically on July 30, 1993 in the United States and Canada alongside Rising Sun, Robin Hood: Men in Tights and So I Married an Axe Murderer. Ranking number fourteen at the North American box office, the film grossed $3,560,469 worldwide.

Video games 
 A video game based on the film was released for the Sega Master System on October 1, 1992 and Sega Game Gear on July 14, 1993, followed by a handheld game by Tiger Electronics released the same year.
 A video game based on the film of same name titled Tom and Jerry: Frantic Antics was released for Game Boy on October 2, 1993 and Sega Genesis on December 21, 1993 by Hi-Tech Expressions and Altron.

Home media 
The film was released on VHS and LaserDisc on October 26, 1993 by Family Home Entertainment. The VHS release of the film was reissued on March 2, 1999 and was released on DVD on March 26, 2002 in United States and on September 26, 2008 in Germany by Warner Home Video. Despite receiving a UK VHS release from First Independent Films, no UK Region 2 DVD release is as of yet currently available. However, UK buyers can import the French, German, Dutch, or South African copies, as they are Region 2, and play in English. The film became available on HBO Max in a digitally-remastered widescreen format on July 1, 2020.

Legacy 
Despite the film's negative reception, Lickboot's line "We've got to have money!" has become a popular internet meme in recent years.

Notes

References

Sources 
 Beck, Jerry (2005). The Animated Movie Guide. Chicago: Chicago Review Press. . pp. 284–285.

External links 

 
 Tom and Jerry: The Movie at the TCM Movie Database
 

1992 films
1990s English-language films
1992 animated films
1992 comedy films
1992 musical films
1990s buddy comedy films
1990s children's comedy films
1990s adventure comedy films
1990s musical comedy films
1990s American animated films
1990s children's animated films
American buddy comedy films
American musical comedy films
American adventure comedy films
American children's animated adventure films
American children's animated comedy films
American children's animated musical films
Animated buddy films
Animated films about friendship
Animated films about cats
Animated films about dogs
Animated films about mice
Animated films about orphans
Compositions by Leslie Bricusse
Films about kidnapping
Films about homelessness
Films about animal rights
Films about child abuse
Films about missing people
Films set in amusement parks
Tom and Jerry films
Films directed by Phil Roman
Films scored by Henry Mancini
Film Roman films
Artisan Entertainment films
Miramax films
Miramax animated films
Film and television memes